Zinc finger and BTB domain-containing protein 40 is a protein that in humans is encoded by the ZBTB40 gene.

References

Further reading

External links 
 

Transcription factors